Jason Miller (born July 24, 1976 in Detroit, Michigan) is an American rabbi and entrepreneur. Miller is the president of Access Technology, in West Bloomfield Township, Michigan, an IT and social media marketing company.

Career 
Miller attended Andover High School (Michigan), graduated from Michigan State University with a bachelor's degree in international relations and then attended the Jewish Theological Seminary where he became an ordained rabbi and earned a master's degree in education. At JTS, Miller was named the first recipient of the Gladstein Fellowship.

In addition to heading a technology company, he also is the founder and director of his own kosher certification agency, Kosher Michigan.

Along with a monthly technology column for The Detroit Jewish News, Miller blogs about the intersection of technology and Judaism for the JewishTechs.com blog, The Huffington Post, Time.com and his own blog, which launched in March 2003.

A 2011 parody on YouTube of Texas Governor Rick Perry's presidential campaign commercial which critics considered anti-gay, gave Miller international attention, with coverage in several print and online media outlets including The Washington Post, The Jewish Daily Forward, CNN, Jewish Journal, Der Spiegel Online, Miami Herald, JTA, and the USA Today.

Miller was listed as the ninth most influential person on "Jewish Twitter" by the Jewish Telegraphic Agency in 2016 and was one of ten winners of a Jewish influencer award from the National Jewish Outreach Program in January 2012. He was chosen as the Community of Excellence Young Entrepreneur of the Year by the Greater West Bloomfield Chamber of Commerce in April 2012. Miller was also cited as one of the top Jewish Twitter users by The Huffington Post and was referred to as "the most technologically savvy Jewish leader in Detroit" by the Detroit Free Press.

Works

References

External links
 
 

1976 births
Living people
American Conservative rabbis
Jewish Theological Seminary of America semikhah recipients
21st-century American rabbis